Jacques Simon Monasch (born 4 January 1962) is a Dutch politician, art collector and former management as well as political consultant and civil servant. He was a member of the House of Representatives between 17 June 2010 and 23 March 2017, where he focused on matters of housing and spatial planning. He was a member of the Labour Party from 1986 to 2016. Due to Monasch leaving the Labour Party, the Second Rutte cabinet lost its majority in the House of Representatives. Several weeks after leaving the Labour Party Monasch announced he would enter the 2017 general election with his new party, Nieuwe Wegen. His party did not obtain any seats in the election.

Monasch studied public administration at the University of Groningen and political economy at the University of Essex. He owns a gallery of Russian art.

Family
At the very least grandfather of Jacques Monasch was Jewish and active in the textile business.

References

External links 
 
  House of Representatives biography

1962 births
Alumni of the University of Exeter
Dutch art collectors
Dutch civil servants
Dutch management consultants
Dutch political consultants
Dutch political party founders
Dutch speechwriters
Labour Party (Netherlands) politicians
Independent politicians in the Netherlands
Living people
Members of the House of Representatives (Netherlands)
Politicians from Rotterdam
University of Groningen alumni
21st-century Dutch politicians
Jewish Dutch politicians